State Route 143 (SR 143) is a  state highway in the U.S. state of Maine. The highway, located entirely in Penobscot County, connects U.S. Route 202 (US 202) and SR 9 in the town of Dixmont and SR 222 in the town of Stetson.

Route description
SR 143 begins at an intersection of Western Avenue (US 202 and SR 9) in the community of Dixmont Center. The highway heads north, later northeast, through a mostly wooded area in the central part of the state. It bends to the east as it passes in front of a few small farms. At Miles Road and Smith Road in the community of Simpson Corners, SR 143 turns to the north again heading through a forested area. In front of an elementary school, the road crosses into the town of Etna. Nearing Etna Center, SR 143 reaches an intersection with SR 69 heading towards the west and ramps to and from the northbound lanes of Interstate 95 (I-95) at its interchange 167. SR 69 and SR 143 form a short concurrency under I-95's overpasses. After passing the I-95's southbound entrance and exit ramps, SR 69 turns off the road to the east while SR 143 continues north.

Continuing through Etna, the highway climbs a small hill before descending again to an intersection with US 2 and SR 100. Past this intersection, the road continues downhill crossing a railroad at the center of the Etna settlement. It passes to the west of Etna Pond before crossing into Stetson. SR 143 resumes passing through a rural area passing to the west of a campground and Pleasant Lake before entering the community of Stetson and ending at SR 222.

Major junctions

References

External links

Floodgap Roadgap's RoadsAroundME: Maine State Route 143

143
Transportation in Penobscot County, Maine